Matilda's Cat is a 2012 children's picture book by Emily Gravett. The book is about Matilda, a girl dressed in a ginger-striped cat costume, who attempts to involve her similarly ginger-striped cat in various activities to no avail but then eventually snuggles up with the cat in bed.

Publication history
2014, USA, Simon & Schuster Books for Young Readers 
2012, England, Macmillan Children's Books

Reception
A review in Kirkus Reviews of Matilda's Cat wrote "A master of animal countenance, Gravett pairs an expressive cat with a busy kid and winks at the difference between textual and visual message", and Booktrust wrote that "Gravett’s illustrations in this funny and touching picture book are as delightful as ever."

Matilda's Cat has also been reviewed by Publishers Weekly, 
Booklist, School Library Journal, Horn Book Guides, Library Media Connection, The Bulletin of the Center for Children's Books, The New York Times, and The Wall Street Journal.

It was long-listed for the 2013 Kate Greenaway Medal .

References

External links
Library holdings of Matilda's Cat

2012 children's books
British picture books
Books about cats